Bacillus subtilis ribonuclease (Proteus mirabilis RNase, ribonucleate nucleotido-2'-transferase (cyclizing)) is an enzyme. This enzyme catalyses the following chemical reaction

 Endonucleolytic cleavage to 2',3'-cyclic nucleotides

References

External links 

EC 3.1.27